The Spies–Robinson House is a historic residence in Portland, Oregon, United States. Built in 1922, it is an exceptional example of a Prairie School house in Northeast Portland. Its use of a brick veneer, while common nationally, is nearly unique in the Northeast quadrant, where stucco walls predominate in Prairie School designs. Additionally, two colors of brick are used to provide detail and accent in the design. The house is also notable for its occupancy starting in 1930 by David Robinson (1890–1963), a locally prominent attorney and civil rights advocate. Robinson is especially associated with public defender services and legal aid, and was a leader in the Portland chapter of the Anti-Defamation League.

The house was entered on the National Register of Historic Places in 1997.

See also
National Register of Historic Places listings in Northeast Portland, Oregon

References

External links

Oregon Historic Sites Database entry

1922 establishments in Oregon
Houses completed in 1922
Houses on the National Register of Historic Places in Portland, Oregon
Irvington, Portland, Oregon
Portland Historic Landmarks